is a prefecture of Japan located on the island of Shikoku. Kōchi Prefecture has a population of 757,914 (1 December 2011) and has a geographic area of 7,103 km2 (2,742 sq mi). Kōchi Prefecture borders Ehime Prefecture to the northwest and Tokushima Prefecture to the northeast.

Kōchi is the capital and largest city of Kōchi Prefecture, with other major cities including Nankoku, Shimanto, and Kōnan. Kōchi Prefecture is located on Japan's Pacific coast surrounding a large bay in the south of Shikoku, with the southernmost point of the island located at Cape Ashizuri in Tosashimizu. Kōchi Prefecture is home to Kōchi Castle, considered the most intact Japanese castle, and the Shimanto River, one of the few undammed rivers in Japan.

History 

Kōchi Prefecture was historically known as Tosa Province and was controlled by the Chōsokabe clan in the Sengoku period and the Yamauchi clan during the Edo period.

Kōchi city is also the birthplace of noted revolutionary Sakamoto Ryōma, who became one of the main instigators of the Meiji Restoration.

Geography 

Kōchi Prefecture comprises the southwestern part of the island of Shikoku, facing the Pacific Ocean. It is bordered by Ehime to the north-west and Tokushima to the north-east. It is the largest but least populous of Shikoku's four prefectures. Most of the province is mountainous, and in only a few areas such as around Kōchi and Nakamura is there a coastal plain. Kōchi is famous for its many rivers. Inamura-yama in Tosa-cho is the highest peak in Kōchi prefecture with an altitude of 1,506 meters above sea level.

As of April 1, 2012, 7% of the total land area of the prefecture was designated as Natural Parks, namely the Ashizuri-Uwakai National Park; Ishizuchi, Muroto-Anan Kaigan, and Tsurugisan Quasi-National Parks; and eighteen Prefectural Natural Parks.

Cities
Eleven cities are located in Kōchi Prefecture:

Towns and villages 

These are the towns and villages in each district:

Mergers

Tourism

 Kōchi Castle, one of only 12 original castles left in Japan
 Aki Castle and samurai's residence district called Doi Kachū
 Okō Castle, Chōsokabe clan's prime castle ruins.
 Kōchi Prefectural Museum of History, Historical Museum located on Okō Castle
 Katsurahama
 Ryugado Cave, one of Japan's top three caves
 Shimanto River, the only undammed river in Japan
 Godaisan
 Anpanman Museum

Media
The 2021 movie Belle (Ryū to Sobakasu no Hime) is set in Kōchi.

The 2013 movie Hospitality Department (Kencho Omotenashi Ka) is set in Kōchi. The film shows views of Kōchi Prefecture.

The 2009 movie The Harimaya Bridge starring Danny Glover was set in Kochi.

Culture

Food
Like most areas of Japan, Kōchi advertises itself as specialising in a major food item, in this case, katsuo no tataki.
Katsuo no tataki is skipjack tuna or bonito, lightly seared. Traditionally this is done over the straw generated as a by-product of the rice harvest.

Sawachi is a term which refers to "a style of meal" in Kochi prefecture, according to Kochi-City Tourism Association.  It says that the characteristic of the style of eating is "its freeness in the arrangement of food on a large dish"  People eat Sawachi in the situation of "Enkai" which refers to a gathering of family, friends and relatives.  They surround "Sawachi", feasts on large dishes, and take own portions by themselves. The style represents the cultural climate of Kochi Prefecture, which dislikes formal arrangements and respects freedom.

Festival and events
Festival
Yosakoi Festival - Yosakoi (よさこい) is a unique style of dance that originated in Japan and that is performed at festivals and events all over the country.

Sports
The sports teams listed below are based in Kōchi.
Baseball
Kōchi Fighting Dogs
Football
Kōchi United SC

See also
Tosa Domain

Notes

References
 Nussbaum, Louis-Frédéric and Käthe Roth. (2005).  Japan encyclopedia. Cambridge: Harvard University Press. ;  OCLC 58053128

External links 

  

 
Shikoku region
Prefectures of Japan